The Washington D.C. Area Film Critics Association Award for Best Art Direction is an annual award given by the Washington D.C. Area Film Critics Association.

Winners and nominees

2000s

2010s

2020s

References

Art Direction, Best
Awards for best art direction